Peter Marino (born 1949) is an American architect and Fellow of the American Institute of Architects. He is the principal of Peter Marino Architect PLLC, an architecture and design firm which he founded in 1978.  The firm is based in New York City with 160 employees and offices in Philadelphia and Southampton.

Education and career 
Marino graduated from Francis Lewis High School in Fresh Meadows, New York City. Marino earned a degree from the Cornell University College of Architecture, Art, and Planning.

Marino began his architectural career working for Skidmore, Owings & Merrill, George Nelson, and I.M. Pei. In 1978, Jed Johnson hired him to do a renovation project for his and Andy Warhol's townhouse on the Upper East Side of Manhattan and the third incarnation of Warhol's Factory at 860 Broadway. His work for Johnson and Warhol led to residential commissions from clients in the art world as well as the European aristocracy.

Notable projects

Barneys New York, New York City (1985) 
In 1985, the Pressman family, who owned Barneys New York at the time, hired Marino to design the women's retail concept for the department store.  This was Marino's first retail project, which led to his designing 17 freestanding Barneys department stores in the U.S. and Japan between 1986 and 1993. Marino's work for Barneys put him in contact with other fashion designers for whom he went on to design boutiques, such as Calvin Klein, Donna Karan, Giorgio Armani, Ermenegildo Zegna and Fendi, and eventually Chanel, Dior and Louis Vuitton.

Giorgio Armani New York, New York City (1996) 
In 1996, Marino designed a freestanding boutique on New York City's Madison Avenue for Giorgio Armani.

In 2004, The New York Times reported that Marino is "widely credited with proving the theory that architectural design can be a strong component of a shopper's identification with a brand", citing the freestanding Giorgio Armani flagship Marino designed in 1996 on Madison Avenue as the embodiment of Armani's "trademark minimalism."

Chanel Ginza Tower, Tokyo (2004) 

The article also references the 2004 Chanel tower in Japan's Ginza district, "that takes Coco Chanel's signature black and white tweed and explodes it into three dimensions." The 56-meter high building incorporated a curtain wall of glass encapsulating a nest-shaped block of aluminum in Chanel handbags’ signature tweed pattern. Notable features included a first of its kind interactive glass facade with 700,000 embedded light-emitting diodes, and a system of 1,120 square meters of canvas roll blinds and state-changing electronic privacy glass which allowed office workers to see out during the day, while providing a black background for the display at night.

170 East End Avenue, New York City (2007) 
In 2007, Marino's first luxury condominium high rise project opened at 170 East End Avenue in New York City.  The building has an expansive marble lobby, leading out to a garden and waterfall in the back.

Bootheshop, Seoul (2014) 
In October 2014, Marino designed the flagship store in Seoul, Korea's Cheongdam-dong neighborhood for Boontheshop, a retail brand owned by Shinsegae, a South Korean luxury product specialist.  The 55,000 square foot project consists of two angular buildings clad in white marble, connected by glass bridges.  It was Marino's first multi-brand store since the Barney's project.

Louis Vuitton, Rodeo Drive, Los Angeles (2015) 
In January 2015, Marino completed the flagship Louis Vuitton shop on Rodeo Drive, in Beverly Hills, California.  The design included a three-layer facade consisting of louver-like stainless steel ribbons over glass over squares of white fabric, which LA Times' fashion reporter Adam Tschorn described as being designed to create an indoor/outdoor feeling.

Hublot 5th Avenue, New York City (2016) 
Marino designed both the building and interiors of luxury Swiss watch brand Hublot’s flagship store in New York on Fifth Avenue between 57th and 58th streets. The tall and slender 1500-square-foot building’s design is inspired by the high-end timepieces sold in the store. The facade consists of hundreds of powder-coated black aluminum panels, positioned at various angles, some lined with LED strips. "The sculptural movement inherent in the facade is an abstract notion of time and the perpetual mechanism of the watch," said Marino.

Chanel Badgat Street, Istanbul (2018)

Completed in 2018, the 8,800-squarefoot building for Chanel in Istanbul, Turkey, includes offices and a rooftop terrace and is “set back behind an entry plaza of gray marble pavers with a black granite reflecting pool." Notable features include the angled white marble façade — which Interior Design calls the “architectural equivalent of Coco Chanel’s white pleated blouses” — and the mirrored stairwell, Marino’s homage to the original Chanel headquarters.

Getty Residences, Lehman Maupin Gallery, Hill Art Foundation, New York City (2018)
In 2018, Marino completed The Getty, a residential building in New York’s Chelsea neighborhood. The Hill Art Foundation occupies the third and fourth floors of the building, with an entrance located at 239 Tenth Avenue.

Chanel Ginza Namiki, Tokyo (2018)

Also in 2018, Marino completed a slender 9-story tower for Chanel in Tokyo. Mukai designed an art installation for the façade for the building's opening. The building includes a spa and offices, in addition to retail.

Cheval Blanc Paris (2021)

Constructed during the COVID-19 pandemic with its opening delayed until Fall of 2021, Cheval Blanc Paris, adjacent to the iconic ‘La Samaritaine’ department store in Paris put Marino in charge of conceiving 9 floors which includes 72 rooms and suites, lobbies, four restaurants (Le Tout Paris, Plentitude, Langosterie, Limbar), and the luxurious Dior Spa with the longest indoor pool in Europe. "Our intention was to transform the iconic Parisian building without disregarding its existing design heritage", Marino commented.

Dior, 30 Ave Montaigne, Paris (2022)
Marino designed the renovation of the Dior flagship store in Paris. Nicolas Milon of Architectural Digest noted,

Awards and recognition 
In 2012, Marino was awarded the Officier of the Ordre des Arts et des Lettres. from the French Ministry of Culture in recognition of his significant contributions to the arts in France.

Personal life 
Marino is married to the costume designer Jane Trapnell; the couple have a daughter. Marino is an art collector; collecting French porcelain, contemporary paintings, modern art, and French and Italian bronzes from the mid 16th to the mid 18th century. Marino's collection of bronzes was displayed at London's Wallace Collection in 2010.
He is also notable for his personal fashion style, which he has called a "tattooed biker look", but just as a "decoy". It features mostly black clothing, leather with buckles and studs, and a leather cap.

Harassment allegations 

Marino has been at the center of two lawsuits in which he was accused of sexual harassment and racial discrimination by former employees. In December 2015 Marino was sued by Deirdre O'Brien, his former office manager, for allegedly making racist and sexist comments. In May 2016, Jonathan Michaud, a former textile specialist at the firm, filed a lawsuit in New York State Court, accusing Marino of sexually harassing him and making homophobic slurs.

In March 2018 the American Institute of Architects New York (AIANY) announced that it was rescinding Marino's 2018 Design Awards citing the harassment allegations. According to Curbed, citing a spokesperson for Peter Marino Architect (PMA), the sexual harassment suit was resolved, while a countersuit was filed against the other claimant.

References

Further reading 

Peter Marino: The Architecture of Chanel
Adrien Dalpayrat: The Peter Marino Collection 
The Garden of Peter Marino
Théodore Deck: The Peter Marino Collection

External links 

Peter Marino on Architectural Digest

1949 births
Living people
21st-century American architects
American art collectors
Francis Lewis High School alumni
Cornell University College of Architecture, Art, and Planning alumni
20th-century American architects